Jeffrey Hoogervorst (born 23 October 1984) is a Dutch retired footballer who played as a central defender.

Club career
Born in Amsterdam, Hoogervorst moved at only 18 from local AFC Ajax to Sporting de Gijón in Spain, after signing a three-year contract. With the Segunda División club he only appeared regularly in the 2005–06 season, also serving a loan at lowly Asturias neighbours Marino de Luanco.

In summer 2006, Hoogervorst agreed to a deal at Real Madrid Castilla also in the second level, but was highly unsuccessful during his brief spell, playing only one match (one minute) as the team were also relegated; in the following transfer window he dropped down to Segunda División B after joining FC Barcelona B, being finally released by the Pep Guardiola-led side in March 2008.

Hoogervorst returned to football ahead of the 2009–10 campaign, moving to Tercera División and returning to former club Marino. He continued to play in Spain's lower leagues until his retirement.

References

External links
Avilés official profile 
 

1984 births
Living people
Footballers from Amsterdam
Dutch footballers
Association football defenders
Segunda División players
Segunda División B players
Tercera División players
Divisiones Regionales de Fútbol players
Sporting de Gijón players
Marino de Luanco footballers
Real Madrid Castilla footballers
FC Barcelona Atlètic players
Zamora CF footballers
Real Avilés CF footballers
Dutch expatriate footballers
Expatriate footballers in Spain
Dutch expatriate sportspeople in Spain